The 60th Venice Biennale is an upcoming international contemporary art exhibition to be held in 2024. The Venice Biennale takes place every two years in Venice, Italy.

Background 
The Venice Biennale is an international art biennial exhibition held in Venice, Italy. Often described as "the Olympics of the art world", participation in the Biennale is a prestigious event for contemporary artists. The festival has become a constellation of shows: a central exhibition curated by that year's artistic director, national pavilions hosted by individual nations, and independent exhibitions throughout Venice. The Biennale parent organization also hosts regular festivals in other arts: architecture, dance, film, music, and theater. 

Outside of the central, international exhibition, individual nations produce their own shows, known as pavilions, as their national representation. Nations that own their pavilion buildings, such as the 30 housed on the Giardini, are responsible for their own upkeep and construction costs as well. Nations without dedicated buildings create pavilions in the Venice Arsenale and palazzos throughout the city.

Central exhibition 

Adriano Pedrosa, curator of the São Paulo Museum of Art, will serve as the 60th Venice Biennale's artistic director.

National pavilions 

Countries began to announce their national representatives soon after the previous exhibition closed in 2022. Each country selects artists to show at their pavilion, ostensibly with an eye to the Biennale's theme.

References

External links 

 

Venice Biennale exhibitions
2024 in Italy